The Commissioner for Research, Science and Innovation was a portfolio within the European Commission. In 2019, the portfolio was merged with the Commissioner for Education, Youth, Sport and Culture to form the role of European Commissioner for Innovation, Research, Culture, Education and Youth, held by Mariya Gabriel.

The portfolio was responsible primarily for research and improving the conditions in the Union for researchers. The post is known familiarly as Science and Research; however it involves other fields such as technology, development etc.

List of commissioners

See also
 Directorate-General for Research
 Joint Research Centre
 European Research Area
 Framework Programmes
 Lisbon Strategy
 European Atomic Energy Community
 Eurodoc
 European Research Advisory Board
 European Research Council
 European Charter for Researchers
 European Council of Applied Sciences and Engineering
 European Institute of Technology

External links
 Commissioner's website
 Commission's research portal 
 EU joint research centre  
 AthenaWeb – European Science Research

Research, Innovation and Science
Commissioner